Digni ruku (trans. Raise Your Hand) is the fifth studio album from Serbian and former Yugoslav rock band Galija.

The song "Winter's Coming" features English language lyrics written by Vaya Con Dios member Dani Klein. The song "Možda spava" is an instrumental track named after Vladislav Petković Dis' poem.

Track listing
All the songs were written by Nenad Milosavljević (music) and Predrag Milosavljević (lyrics), except where noted.
"Digni ruku" – 3:26
"Na tvojoj strani kreveta" – 4:34
"Hodnici sećanja" – 4:37
"Bubanj i bas" – 4:19
"Ja i moj auto" (J. J. Roscam, P. Milosavljević) - 3:34
"Winter's Coming" (J. J. Roscam, D. Klein) – 4:13
"Trudim se" (J. J. Roscam, N. Milosavljević, P. Milosavljević) – 3:41
"Šok" (J. J. Roscam, P. Milosavljević) – 3:49
"Svaki dan sa njom" – 3:46
"Možda spava" – 4:35

Personnel
Nenad Milosavljević - vocals
Predrag Milosavljević- vocals
Jean Jacques Roscam - guitar
Branislav Radulović - guitar
Zoran Radosavljević - bass guitar
Boban Pavlović - drums

Guest musicians
Goran Grbić - trumpet
Nenad Petrović - saxophone
Nenad Stefanović - bass guitar
Saša Lokner - keyboards
Bobana Stojković - backing vocals

References 
 EX YU ROCK enciklopedija 1960-2006,  Janjatović Petar;  

Galija albums
1986 albums
PGP-RTB albums